Pedro Santos (born 14 May 1955) is a Puerto Rican judoka. He competed in the men's middleweight event at the 1976 Summer Olympics.

References

1955 births
Living people
Puerto Rican male judoka
Olympic judoka of Puerto Rico
Judoka at the 1976 Summer Olympics
Place of birth missing (living people)